Yola, historically the Forth and Bargy dialect, is a revived Anglic language once spoken widely in the baronies of Forth and Bargy in County Wexford, Ireland. It is thought to have evolved from Middle English, which was brought to Ireland during the Norman invasion, beginning in 1169. As such, it was similar to the Fingallian language of the Fingal area. Both became functionally extinct in the 19th century when they were replaced by modern Hiberno-English, The name "Yola" means "old" in the language.

History

The language was spoken in County Wexford, particularly in the baronies of Forth and Bargy. This was the first area English-speakers came to in the Norman invasion of Ireland, supporting the theory that it evolved from the Middle English introduced in that period. As such it is thought to have been similar to Fingallian, which was spoken in the Fingal region north of Dublin. Middle English, the mother tongue of the "Old English" community, was widespread throughout southeastern Ireland until the 14th century; as the Old English were increasingly assimilated into Irish culture, their original language was gradually displaced through Gaelicisation. After this point, Yola and Fingallian were the only attested relicts of this original form of English.

Modern English was widely introduced by British colonists during and after the 17th century, forming the basis for the modern Hiberno-English of Ireland. The new varieties were notably distinct from the surviving relict dialects. As English continued to spread, both Yola and the Fingallian died out in the 19th century, though Yola continued to be used as a liturgical language by the churches of Wexford well into the 20th century, to this day the Kilmore Choir sings what were once Yola tunes, now anglicized.

The speech of Forth and Bargy was the only kind in Ireland included in Alexander John Ellis's work On Early English Pronunciation Volume V, which was the earliest survey of “dialects of English”. The phonetics of the language were taken from a local reverend.

Revival and use after the mid-19th century 
Though Yola ceased to be used as a means of daily communication after the mid-19th century, it continued to see significant usage as a liturgical language, and some personal usage within the linguist community of Ireland, such as Kathleen Browne's letter to Ireland dated to 10 April 1893. Browne was a fluent Yola speaker and wrote a number of articles including The Ancient Dialect of the Baronies of Forth and Bargy in 1927.

County Wexford native Paddy Berry is noted for his condensed performances of the piece "A Yola Zong" which he has performed for various recordings, the latest of which was in 2017. Various Yola rhymes, passed down from generation to generation, can be heard spoken by a Wexford woman in a documentary recorded in 1969 on the present usage and rememberers of Yola in the former baronies of Forth and Bargy.

Yola Farmstead, a community-operated reenactment of a Forth and Bargy village as it would have been during the 18th century, delivered a speech and performance of a song in Yola at their opening ceremony, featured Yola phrases in their advertisements, and hosted events where participants could learn some of the language from linguists and other experts on it. The Yola Farmstead also hosted a memorial event dedicated to Jack Devereux of the Kilmore Choir, which once used Yola extensively in their Christmas services. Devereux was a preservationist of, and well-versed in, Yola: locals considered him to be the last native speaker of the language, and a rendition of the Lord's Prayer translated into Yola was read at his memorial.

The Yola Farm has since closed down but since 2021 there have been efforts to reopen it. Wikitongues also has a section dedicated to Yola on its website which hosts language documentation and revitalization resources. There also exists various groups focused on reviving the Yola language.

Phonology
As in the Dutch language, in southwestern varieties of English and (to a lesser extent) in German, most voiceless fricatives in Yola became voiced. The Middle English vowels are well-preserved, having only partially and sporadically undergone the changes associated with the Great Vowel Shift.

One striking characteristic of Yola was the fact that stress shifted to the second syllable of words in many instances:  "morsel",  "hatchet",  "dinner",  "reader",  "wedding", etc.

Pronunciation

Consonants:
 variably pronounced as in Dutch "ik", example barich pronounced as in English "ick", or as in English "itch", such as in "ditch"

Vowels:

 (o as in boot)
 (e as in bee)
 (as in man but longer)
 is in "cat"
 as in "father"
 as in "let"
 as in "may"
 as in "bit"
 (ee) as in "bee"
 as in "spot"
 as in "boat" (cot–coat merger)
 as in "boot", but shorter
 as in "boot'
 as a mix between the i in spin and the ee in "bee' (possibly )
 an oiy sound not in English
 at the end of a word is pronounced, but only short (examples: ross-laar-e (rosslaaré), moidh-e (mýdhe))

Grammar

Pronouns
Yola pronouns were similar to Middle English pronouns.

Articles
The definite article was at first a or ee, which was later replaced by the.

Verb 
Yola verbs had some conservative characteristics. The second and third person plural endings were sometimes -eth as in Chaucerian English. The past participle retained the Middle English "y" prefix as "ee".

Nouns
Some nouns retained the -en plural of ME children, such as been 'bees' and tren 'trees'.

Vocabulary
The glossary compiled by Jacob Poole provides most of what is known about the Forth and Bargy vocabulary. Poole was a farmer and member of the Religious Society of Friends (Quakers) from Growtown in the Parish of Taghmon on the border between the baronies of Bargy and Shelmalier. He collected words and phrases from his tenants and farm labourers between 1800 and his death in 1827.

Although most of its vocabulary is Anglo-Saxon in origin, Yola contains many borrowings from Irish and French.

Interrogative words

Prepositions

Pronouns and determiners

Other words

Cardinal numbers

Modern South Wexford English 

Diarmaid Ó Muirithe travelled to South Wexford in 1978 to study the English spoken there. His informants ranged in age between 40 and 90. Among the long list of words still known or in use at that time are the following:
 Amain: ‘going on amain’ = getting on well
 Bolsker: an unfriendly person
 Chy: a little
 Drazed: threadbare
 Fash: confusion, in a fash
 Keek: to peep
 Saak: to sunbathe, to relax in front of the fire
 Quare: very, extremely
 Wor: seaweed
Amain is a Norman word which means 'of easy use'.

Examples

A Yola song
The following is a song in Yola with a rough translation into English.

Address to Lord Lieutenant in 1836
Congratulatory address in the dialect of Forth and Bargy, presented to the Earl of Mulgrave, Lord Lieutenant of Ireland, on his visit to Wexford in 1836. Taken from the Wexford Independent newspaper of 15 February 1860. The paper's editor Edmund Hore wrote:

"The maiden of Rosslare"

This following is a Yola poem from an original document containing accents to aid pronunciation;

Notes

References

 
 
 
 
 
 
 Poole's Glossary (1867) – Ed. Rev. William Barnes (Editorial 'Observations')
 Poole's Glossary (1979) – Ed. Dr. D. O'Muirithe & T.P. Dolan (Corrected Etymologies)

External links
 Yola Wikisource on Multilingual Wikisource
 “Gabble Ing Yola” A Yola revival resource center
 A Glossary, With some Pieces of Verse, of the old Dialect of the English Colony in the Baronies of Forth and Bargy, County of Wexford, Ireland. Formerly collected By Jacob Poole, of Growtown, Taghmon, County of Wexford: And now edited, with some Introductory Observations, Additions from various sources, and Notes, By William Barnes, B. D. Author of a Grammar of the Dorsetshire Dialect. London, 1867: Internet Archive, Google Books
 from RTÉ:
 Songs sung in the Yola language on RTE, i.e. archives (under Kilmore Christmas carols)
 Yola - Lost for Words - an RTE documentary by Shane Dunphy
 A People Apart In Wexford 1969 - an RTE television documentary
 Jacob Poole of Growtown — And the Yola Dialect

Languages attested from the 12th century
Languages extinct in the 20th century
County Wexford
Anglic languages
Extinct Germanic languages
Extinct languages of Europe
Languages of the United Kingdom
Languages of the Republic of Ireland
Medieval languages